Kite skating, sometimes referred to as ice kite skating, para-skating or para ice skating, is an ice-based sport using a large controllable kite to propel ice skaters across frozen rivers, frozen lakes and other frozen surfaces. With a traditional diamond-shaped kite it's quite possible to go much faster than the wind speed by angling the kite much as a sailboat can trim its course and sails for greater speed. In fact, it's possible to exceed safe speeds quite easily, leaving one's legs exhausted from absorbing the shock of bumpy ice and becoming susceptible to spectacular crashes. On a gusty winter day one spends considerable time raising the kite in the air parallel to the ice or to the opposite direction of riding to slow down somewhat. This sport unlocks a lot of possibilities on new tricks to be added or invented like ''Double around the world" in the YouTube video - This is Kiteskating. Helmet, elbow and knee protection strongly advised. Also much smaller kite suggested than same wind conditions on the water as there is no friction or resistance on the ice skates. Be very cautious not to ride over the lines while setting up.

External links
 Kite ice skating example on YouTube
THIS IS KITESKATING Latest video of Latvian guys pushing the sport forward kiting on a frozen part of sea

Ice skating
Kites
Ice in transportation

THIS IS KITESKATING